Alaudi is a village located in Kapurthala district, Punjab.

Demography 
As per Population Census 2011, the Alaudi village has population of 147 of which 74 are males while 73 are females.  The village is administrated by Sarpanch an elected representative of the village.  Literacy rate of Alaudi is 78.79%, higher than state average of 75.84%.  The population of children under the age of 6 years is 15 which is 10.20% of total population of Alaudi, and child sex ratio is approximately 986 higher than Punjab average of 846.

Population data

Villages in Kapurthala

External links
  Villages in Kapurthala
 Kapurthala Villages List

References

Villages in Kapurthala district